Aristippus of Cyrene (c. 435 – c. 356 BCE) was a hedonistic Greek philosopher and the founder of the Cyrenaic school of philosophy. He was a pupil of Socrates, but adopted a very different philosophical outlook, teaching that the goal of life was to seek pleasure by adapting circumstances to oneself and by maintaining proper control over both adversity and prosperity. His view that pleasure is the only good came to be called ethical hedonism. Despite having two sons, Aristippus identified his daughter Arete as the "intellectual heiress" of his work.  

There are indications that Aristippus was conflated with his grandson, Aristippus the Younger.

Life 

Aristippus, the son of Aritades, was born in Cyrene, Ancient Libya, c. 435 BCE. He came to Greece to be present at the Olympic games, where he asked Ischomachus about Socrates, and by his description was filled with so ardent a desire to see Socrates, that he went to Athens for the purpose, and remained with him almost up to the time of his execution in 399. Diodorus dates him to 366, which agrees very well with the facts known about him, and with the statement that Lais, the courtesan with whom he was intimate, was born in 421.

Though a disciple of Socrates, Aristippus wandered very far both in principle and practice from the teaching and example of his great master. He lived luxuriously, was happy to seek sensual gratification and the company of the notorious Lais. He also took money for his teaching, the first of Socrates'  disciples to do so and even told Socrates that he resided in a foreign land in order to escape the trouble of involving himself in the politics of his native city. He passed part of his life at the court of Dionysius I of Syracuse or Dionysius the Younger, and is also said to have been taken prisoner by Artaphernes, the satrap who drove the Spartans from Rhodes in 396. He appears, however, at last to have returned to Cyrene, and there he spent his old age.

In Book VI of De architectura, Vitruvius describes Aristippus:
It is related of the Socratic philosopher Aristippus that, being shipwrecked and cast ashore on the coast of the Rhodians, he observed geometrical figures drawn thereon, and cried out to his companions: "Let us be of good cheer, for I see the traces of man." With that he made for the city of Rhodes, and went straight to the gymnasium. There he fell to discussing philosophical subjects, and presents were bestowed upon him, so that he could not only fit himself out, but could also provide those who accompanied him with clothing and all other necessaries of life. When his companions wished to return to their country, and asked him what message he wished them to carry home, he bade them say this: that children ought to be provided with property and resources of a kind that could swim with them even out of a shipwreck.

Philosophy

The anecdotes which are told of Aristippus (there are many in Diogenes Laërtius) by no means give us the notion of a person who was the mere slave of his passions, but rather of one who took a pride in extracting enjoyment from all circumstances of every kind, and in controlling adversity and prosperity alike. They illustrate and confirm the two statements of Horace, that to observe the precepts of Aristippus is "to endeavour to adapt circumstances to myself, not myself to circumstances" and that, "every complexion of life, every station and circumstance sat gracefully upon him." Thus when reproached for his love of bodily indulgences, he answered, that "it is not abstinence from pleasures that is best, but mastery over them without ever being worsted". When Dionysius, provoked at some of his remarks, ordered him to take the lowest place at table, he said, "You wish to dignify the seat". His statement "wise people, even though all laws were abolished, would still lead the same life" is a quote sometimes, and erroneously, attributed to the comic poet Aristophanes.
  
Whether Aristippus was a prisoner to a satrap, grossly insulted and even spit upon by a tyrant, enjoying the pleasures of a banquet, or reviled for faithlessness to Socrates by his fellow-pupils, he maintained the same calm temper. He seemed insulting to Xenophon and Plato, as seen from the Memorabilia, where he maintains a discussion against Socrates in defense of voluptuous enjoyment, and from the Phaedo, where his absence at the death of Socrates, though he was only at Aegina, 200 stadia from Athens, is doubtless mentioned as a reproach. Aristotle, too, calls him a sophist, and notices a story of Plato's speaking to him, with rather undue vehemence, and of his replying with calmness.

Aristippus imparted his doctrine to his daughter Arete who, in turn, imparted it to her son, Aristippus the Younger, who is said to have reduced it to a system. Although his dubious reputation has survived into modern times, his philosophy of ethical hedonism, as its name implies, was not entirely amoral. He admonished his students to never harm others, and cautioned that the pursuit of pleasure ought to be moderated by moral self-restraint.

Works
None of Aristippus's works are extant. Diogenes Laërtius, on the authority of Sotion and Panaetius, gives a long list of books whose authorship is ascribed to Aristippus, though he also states that according to Sosicrates of Rhodes, Aristippus never wrote anything. Some letters attributed to him are forgeries. 

One work attributed to Aristippus in ancient times was a scandalous book entitled On Ancient Luxury (or On the Luxury of the Ancients); although it has long been realized that this work could not have been written by Aristippus of Cyrene, not least because the author mentions Theophrastus, who lived a generation after Aristippus. The name may have been adopted by the writer to suggest a connection with the hedonistic philosopher. This work, judging by the quotations preserved by Diogenes Laërtius, was filled with spicy anecdotes about philosophers and their supposed taste for courtesans or boys. Thus the author supports his claims for Plato's various erotic relationships through his quotation of epigrams attributed to the philosopher, and makes an extreme allegation that Periander committed incest with his own mother.

Notes

References

Attribution

Further reading

 Voula Tsouna, The Epistemology of the Cyrenaic School, Cambridge: Cambridge University Press. 1998.
 Ugo Zilioli, The Cyrenaics, New York: Acumen / Routledge, 2012.

External links

Cyrenaics Resource Handbook of Cyrenaic resources, primary and secondary, includes Aristippus
Aristippus of Cyrene on Ancient History Encyclopedia

430s BC births
360s BC deaths
4th-century BC philosophers
Ancient Greek ethicists
Cyrenaic philosophers
Cyrenean Greeks
Metic philosophers in Classical Athens
Pupils of Socrates